Go All the Way is the eighteenth album released by The Isley Brothers for their T-Neck imprint on April 19, 1980.

The album was remastered and expanded for inclusion in the 2015 released CD box set The RCA Victor & T-Neck Album Masters, 1959-1983.

Reception

The album contains the Billboard number-one R&B ballad, "Don't Say Goodnight (It's Time For Love)", and the number 11 mid-tempo hit "Here We Go Again".

Track listing

Personnel
Ronald Isley - musical arrangement, lead vocals, background vocals
O'Kelly Isley Jr. - musical arrangement, background vocals
Rudolph Isley - musical arrangement, background vocals
Ernie Isley - background vocals (5), musical arrangement, guitar, drums, timbales, congas, other percussion
Marvin Isley - background vocals (5), musical arrangement, bass played by, percussion
Chris Jasper - background vocals (5), piano (5), string synthesizer (5), musical arrangement, keyboards, synthesizers, drums, timbales, congas, other percussion

Charts

Weekly charts

Year-end charts

Singles

Certifications

See also
List of number-one R&B albums of 1980 (U.S.)

References

External links
 The Isley Brothers-Go All The Way at Discogs

1980 albums
The Isley Brothers albums
T-Neck Records albums